The Macintosh Quadra 660AV, originally sold as the Macintosh Centris 660AV, is a personal computer designed, manufactured and sold by Apple Computer from July 1993 to September 1994. It was introduced alongside the Quadra 840AV; the "AV" after both model numbers signifies video input and output capabilities and enhanced audio.

The 660AV was discontinued a few months after the introduction of the Power Macintosh 6100/60AV. This and the Quadra 630 were positioned for users who were not ready to move to PowerPC.

Hardware 
The 660AV uses the pizza box form factor of the earlier Centris 610. The 660AV has a full Motorola 68040 instead of the 610's FPU-less 68LC040. Like the 840AV, the 660AV features video input/output capability and an onboard AT&T 3210 digital signal processor (here clocked at 55 MHz) to make the video handling less of a burden on the CPU.

The 660AV is the first Macintosh to include GeoPort; an optional GeoPort Telecom Adapter enables fax and modem capabilities.

Some of the earliest Centris 660AVs have the older auto-inject floppy drive opening similar to the 610, but most of the Centris models and all of the Quadra models have a drive similar to the Power Macintosh 6100, lacking the auto-inject feature. These models have a deep round indentation at the center of the floppy drive slot to make it possible to fully insert the disk.

The Quadra AV Macs introduced a new universal ROM (codenamed SuperMario) that would later be used in all PowerPC systems. It includes SCSI Manager 4.3 and Sound Manager 3.0. It also is "vectorized", making it easier to patch.

Models 
Introduced July 29, 1993:
 Macintosh Centris 660AV

Introduced October 21, 1993:
 Macintosh Quadra 660AV

Reception
Jonathan Chevreau of the National Post said on August 7, 1993 that the Quadra 840AV and Centris 660AV were the next most interesting multimedia computers behind the new SGI Indy, putting Apple among the forefront of the birth of the major industry of desktop multimedia. Byte magazine said in September 1993 that Apple and Silicon Graphics were trailblazers by setting audio and video input as default features of these two Macintosh and of the Indy desktop PCs, which "could change the way businesspeople communicate".

References

External links 

 Centris 660av (Quadra 660AV) at Low End Mac
 Centris 660AV and Quadra 660AV at EveryMac.com

660AV
660AV
Quadra 660AV
Quadra 660AV
Computer-related introductions in 1993